This is a list of classical guitarists.

Baroque (17th and 18th centuries)

19th century

20th century

Modern

See also
 List of flamenco guitarists

References 

 
Classical
Classical guitar